So Low may refer to:

"So Low" (Ocean Colour Scene song)
"So Low" (Self song)
So Low, an album by Outlaws

See also
Solow (disambiguation)